Isanlu is a town in Kogi State. It is the headquarters of Yagba East local government area of Kogi State in the south western part of Nigeria. The current Agbana of Isanlu is Ọbá Moses Babatunde Etombi.

Culture 

Isanlu is the political, social, and cultural center of the Yagba East, Mopa-Muro, and Yagba West local government areas. It is mainly populated by the indigenous Okun people.

Economy 
Isanlu is populated by mainly farmers, and a few traders. This is mainly because of lack of infrastructure and development in the town.

Festival 
New Yam festival 
Egungun Festival
Christian festivals e.g. Christmas and Easter celebrations
Muslim festivals e.g. Eid Al-Fitr and Eid Al-Adha celebrations
Isanlu  Day
 iyinfest

Notable people 

 Pius Adesanmi
 Grace Oyelude
 Eyitayo Lambo
 Jide Omokore

Education 

 Tertiary Institution

Okunland International College of Nursing Science, Isanlu

 Secondary schools

Isanlu Community Secondary, Isanlu
St Kizito's College, Isanlu
Oluyori Muslim Comprehensive High School, Isanlu
African Church Secondary School, Isanlu
Folu International Schools, Isanlu
Government Day Secondary School, Isanlu
Lg Secondary School Idofin Isanlu
Michaelian Group of Schools, Isanlu
Isanlu High School, Ijowa Isanlu

 Primary schools

Community Primary School, Isanlu
St. Joseph Primary School, Isanlu
St Michael the Archangel Nursery/Primary School, Isanlu
Ecwa Rev. Thamer Nursery and Primary School, Isanlu
Yelgea Primary School, Isanlu
Michaelian Catholic Nursery and Primary, School

Religion 
Christianity is the dominant religion in Isanlu, seconded by Muslim and Traditional beliefs.

References

External links 

Populated places in Kogi State